"Put Your Lights On" is a song by American rock band Santana and American musician Everlast from Santana's 18th studio album, Supernatural (1999). Released to US rock radio in August 1999, the song peaked at number 18 on the Billboard Bubbling Under Hot 100 and number eight on the Billboard Mainstream Rock Tracks chart. "Put Your Lights On" won a Grammy Award for Best Rock Performance by a Duo or Group with Vocal at the 42nd Annual Grammy Awards.

Background
Everlast wrote the song while recovering from a major heart attack that he had suffered in February 1998 (directly after he completed recording his first solo album, Whitey Ford Sings the Blues). He has referred to it as "one of the most personal songs I ever wrote", stating that the song was "kind of all about hope, but it's coming from a really dark place you know, so... and really questioning a lot of your beliefs, and affirming, you know, stuff in your soul." Everlast converted to Islam in 1996, and the end of the song contains the words "La ilaha illa Allah", ("There is no God but God" in Arabic), the first part of the Shahada, the Islamic profession of faith.

Santana called Everlast in 1998, asking him if he could contribute a song for Supernatural, and Everlast suggested "Put Your Lights On". According to Everlast, Santana loved the song, and "from then on everything went very fast." Everlast has stated that he was unsure whether to include the Arabic-language portion in the recorded song, because "I did not want to sell Allah's words", but that Santana insisted that they be included.

Track listings

Australian CD single
 "Put Your Lights On" (featuring Everlast) – 4:10
 "Smooth" (remix featuring Rob Thomas) – 3:53
 "Maria Maria" (radio mix featuring the Product G&B) – 4:25

UK CD single
 "Put Your Lights On" (radio edit featuring Everlast) – 4:03
 "Maria Maria" (Spanish-English version featuring the Product G&B) – 4:15
 "El farol" (album version) – 4:59

European CD single
 "Put Your Lights On" (radio edit featuring Everlast) – 4:03
 "Maria Maria" (Spanish-English version featuring the Product G&B) – 4:15

German maxi-CD single
 "Put Your Lights On" (radio edit featuring Everlast) – 4:03
 "Put Your Lights On" (album version featuring Everlast) – 4:47
 "Maria Maria" (Spanish-English version featuring the Product G&B) – 4:15
 "El farol" (album version) – 4:59

Credits and personnel
Credits are taken from the German maxi-CD single liner notes and the Supernatural album booklet.

Studios
 Engineered at Fantasy Studios (Berkeley, California) and South Beach Studios (Miami Beach, Florida)
 Mixed at South Beach Studios (Miami Beach, Florida)
 Mastered at Sterling Sound (New York City)

Personnel

 Everlast – writing (as Erik Schrody), lead vocals, rhythm guitar
 Carlos Santana – lead guitar, congas, percussion
 Benny Rietveld – bass
 Chester Thompson – keyboards
 Dante Ross – production, programming
 John Gamble – production, programming, engineering
 Tom Lord-Alge – mixing
 Femio Hernandez – mixing assistant
 Steve Fontano – engineering
 Steve Farrone – engineering
 Mike Anderson – engineering assistant

Charts

Release history

References

External links
 Santana fan site with info about the song at www.UltimateSantana.com

1998 songs
1999 singles
Everlast (musician) songs
Music videos directed by Marcus Raboy
Santana (band) songs
Arista Records singles